Bari Malik (1918 – 22 December 2015) was a film studio owner and a film producer of Pakistan.

Biography
His birth name was Malik Ghulam Bari.
Bari Malik married three times, his first wife was Suraiya who was the ex-wife of Nasir Khan, Dilip Kumar's brother. His second wife was film actress Najma. Bari Malik and Najma together had three sons, Raheel, Khurram and Zaraq. Then later in his life, he married film actress Saloni and the two of them had a daughter.

Bari Malik was considered one of the pioneers of the Pakistani film industry. A couple of his initial films Mahi Munda (1956) and Yakke Wali became huge commercial successes and earned him a lot of money. He ended up building his own film studio called Bari Studios in Lahore with his earnings. 

He also became controversial in Pakistan by first importing an Indian film in 1954, Jaal. Many local film industry people got upset over this because they felt that the local film industry was not given enough time yet to establish itself in its early days. Street protests resulted in Lahore, Pakistan and this was later named Jaal movement by the local news media in 1954.

Filmography

As a producer
Mahi Munda (1956)
Yakke Wali (1957)
Sehti (1957)
Yaar Beli (1959)
Doosri Shadi (1968)

Death and legacy
Bari Malik died on 22 December 2015 in Lahore, Pakistan at the age of 97. He was buried in Gulberg, Lahore, Pakistan. Many Pakistani film personalities attended his funeral who called his death a big loss for the Pakistani film industry.

References

External links

1918 births
2015 deaths
Pakistani film producers
People from Lahore
Punjabi film producers
Urdu film producers